Megan D'Ewes Timothy (born June 21, 1943) is a Rhodesian-American actress and singer. She is also the author of a memoir titled Let Me Die Laughing!: Waking from The Nightmare of a Brain Explosion, an account of her brain injury.

Background
The daughter of an architect, Timothy was born in Rhodesia (now Zimbabwe) in 1943. At the age of 16 she began working for the Victoria Times and later worked as a horse trainer. 

In 1964 Timothy moved to California aged 21. There, she worked as a switchboard operator and a waitress at the Playboy Club. Timothy was fired from Playboy after she reportedly threw water in a patron's face in an effort to extinguish a fire on his beard that she had set while attempting to light his cigarette. After leaving Playboy, Timothy began working as an actor and screenwriter. 

In the mid 1970s, Timothy purchased a bed and breakfast in North Hollywood, Los Angeles called La Maida House, which she ran until the 1990s. In 1999, and in now in her late 50s, she sold her North Hollywood home, her car and a number of her possessions. This was in preparation to undertake what would be a 12,000-mile solo bicycle journey. Her journey would take her to various places in Western Europe and to parts of Africa. In 2003, she suffered a brain aneurysm and lost her ability to speak. Her book Let Me Die Laughing!: Waking from The Nightmare of a Brain Explosion details her injury and road to recovery.

Film career
In 1967, Timothy earned her first credited film role in the Russ Meyer film Good Morning... and Goodbye!. In 1968, she appeared in Hells Chosen Few, the first of three David L. Hewitt films in which she would appear. Her second film with Hewitt was The Mighty Gorga, in which she played trapper April Adams who embarks on a quest to find a 50-foot gorilla. Her last film with Hewitt was  The Girls from Thunder Strip (1970)  about three bootlegging sisters who take on a gang of bikers.

Filmography

Music
During the 1960s, Timothy performed folk music at various coffee houses. She also entertained troops in Vietnam as part of a USO tour. In February 1967, she was a regular performer at the Rainbow Room Nashville, Tennessee.

Around 2010, some years after her stroke, she sought vocal coaching. She was coached vocally by Michael Rivers. Four years later her first CD album was released. Due to her brain injury, there had been some issues recording the album. In 2014, she released the album As I Wander: Songs of Christmas which featured vocalist Dan Cobb, singer-guitarist/producer Rivers, and cellist Marlene Moore.

Recordings
 As I Wander: Songs of Christmas

Stroke
After her mother died, and having lost most of her possessions in a fire, Timothy suffered a stroke in September 2003, at the age of 63. The stroke was caused by arteriovenous malformation. She suffered severe aphasia as a result of the stroke. Being unable to speak and having no family and no funds to look after herself, she became a ward of the state and was housed in a rehabilitation facility for two weeks. According to the September/October edition of Stroke Connection magazine, the rehabilitation facility was actually a mental hospital. She was told by the head nurse there that she would not be able to read and write or speak again. A couple of her friends managed to get her released. Prior to the stroke, Timothy did not have any kind of medical coverage, but was eventually enrolled in a California Medicaid program. A short documentary called Chicken, which was about her stroke and her adventure, was screened at the Fontaine Auditorium of Samuel Merritt University, 400 Hawthorne Avenue, Oakland, on Wednesday, August 4, 2010.

Publications

References

External links
 
 Out of Africa April 2000 article page 24 - Saddle-sore Megan’s 10,000-mile odyssey
 Youtube: Megan Timothy
 California Library Literacy Services - 26-07-07: Interview with Megan Timothy, Part 1
 California Library Literacy Services - 26-07-07: Interview with Megan Timothy, Part 2, Q&A

1943 births
Living people
American folk singers
White Rhodesian people
Rhodesian writers
Rhodesian singers
Rhodesian emigrants to the United States